Man to Men (French: D'homme à hommes is a 1948 French-Swiss historical drama film directed by Christian-Jaque and starring Jean-Louis Barrault, Bernard Blier and Hélène Perdrière.

Plot
The film depicts Henri Dunant and the founding of the Red Cross.

Cast
Jean-Louis Barrault as Henri Dunant
Bernard Blier as Coquillet
Hélène Perdrière as Elsa Kastner
Denis d'Inès as Guillaume-Henri Dufour
Berthe Bovy as Dunant's mother
Maurice Escande as Jérôme de Lormel
Jean Debucourt as Napoleon III
René Arrieu as Attia
Carmen Boni as Tamberlani

References

External links

 

1948 films
1940s historical drama films
1940s French-language films
Films directed by Christian-Jaque
French historical drama films
Swiss historical drama films
Films about Nobel laureates
Films set in the 19th century
Henry Dunant
Films set in Switzerland
Films shot in Switzerland
French black-and-white films
Swiss black-and-white films
1948 drama films
Films scored by Joseph Kosma
French-language Swiss films
1940s French films